is a railway station in Kiyama, Saga prefecture, Japan.

Lines 
Kyūshū Railway Company
Kagoshima Main Line
Amagi Railway
Amagi Line

Adjacent stations 

|-
|colspan=5 style="text-align:center;" |Kyūshū Railway Company

|-
|colspan=5 style="text-align:center;" |Amagi Railway

History
On 11 November 1918, Japanese Government Railways (JGR) opened the Kiyamaguchi Signal Box at the present location of the station. On 5 August 1921, the facility was upgraded to a full station and renamed Kiyama. On 1 April 1986, Japanese National Railways (JNR), the successor of JGR, handed over control of the Amagi Line to the third sector corporation Amagi Railway. On 1 April 1987, with the privatization of JNR, JR Kyushu took over control of Kiyama station.

Passenger statistics
In fiscal 2016, the station was used by an average of 3,826 passengers daily (boarding passengers only), and it ranked 54th among the busiest stations of JR Kyushu.

References

External links
 Kiyama Station (JR Kyushu) 
 Amagi Railway Official Site 

Railway stations in Saga Prefecture
Railway stations in Japan opened in 1921